Roman Vladimirovich Yevmenyev (born 30 January 1979) is a former Russian professional footballer.

External links
 

1979 births
Living people
Russian footballers
Association football midfielders
Russian expatriate footballers
Expatriate footballers in Ukraine
Expatriate footballers in Moldova
Ukrainian Premier League players
FC Zirka Kropyvnytskyi players
FC Zorya Luhansk players
FC Baltika Kaliningrad players
FC Mordovia Saransk players
FC Angusht Nazran players
FC Khimik Dzerzhinsk players
FC Salyut Belgorod players
Moldovan Super Liga players
FC Znamya Truda Orekhovo-Zuyevo players